Jamini Roy (Bengali: যামিনী রায়) (11 April 1887 – 24 April 1972) was an Indian painter. He was honoured by the Government of India the award of Padma Bhushan in 1954. He remains one of the most famous pupils of Abanindranath Tagore, another praised Indian artist and instructor.

Early life and background 
Jamini Roy was born on 11 April 1887 into a moderately prosperous Kayastha family of land-owners in Beliatore village of the Bankura district, West Bengal. He was raised in an average middle-class, art loving household which ultimately influenced his future decisions.

When he was sixteen he was sent to study at the Government College of Art, Kolkata. Abanindranath Tagore, the founder of Bengal school was vice-principal at the institution. He was taught to paint in the prevailing academic tradition drawing Classical nudes and painting in oils and in 1908 he received his Diploma in Fine Art.

However, he soon realized that he needed to draw inspiration, not from Western traditions, but from his own culture, and so he looked to the living folk and tribal art for inspiration. He was most influenced by the Kalighat Pat (Kalighat painting), which was a style of art with bold sweeping brush-strokes. He moved away from his earlier impressionist landscapes and portraits and between 1921 and 1924 began his first period of experimentation with the Santhal dance as his starting point. Jamini Roy had 4 sons and 1 daughter.

Style 
Roy began his career as a commissioned portrait painter. Somewhat abruptly in the early 1920s, he gave up commissioned portrait painting in an effort to discover his own.

Roy changed style from his academic Western training and featured a new style based on Bengali folk traditions.

Roy is also described as an art machine because he produced 20,000 paintings in his lifetime which is about 10 paintings daily but made sure his artistic aims remained the same. He always targeted to the ordinary middle class as the upholder of art however he was thronged by the rich. Keeping his respect to the middle class reflected on his critical views; he believed that ordinary people were more important than governments because they were the voice of his art.

His underlying quest was threefold: to capture the essence of simplicity embodied in the life of the folk people; to make art accessible to a wider section of people; and to give Indian art its own identity. Jamini Roy's paintings were put on exhibition for the first time in the British India Street of Calcutta (Kolkata) in 1938. During the 1940s, his popularity touched new highs, with the Bengali middle class and the European community becoming his main clientele. In 1946, his work was exhibited in London and in 1953, in New York. He was awarded the Padma Bhushan in 1954. His work has been exhibited extensively in international exhibitions and can be found in many private and public collections such as the Victoria and Albert Museum, London. He spent most of his life living and working in Calcutta. Initially he experimented with Kalighat paintings but found that it has ceased to be strictly a "patua" and went to learn from village patuas. Consequently, his techniques as well as subject matter was influenced by traditional art of Bengal.

He preferred himself to be called a patua. Jamini Roy died in 1972. He was survived by four sons and a daughter. Currently his successors (daughters-in-law and grand children and their children) stay at the home he had built in Ballygunge Place, Kolkata. His works can be found in various museums and galleries across the globe.

Awards 
In 1934, he received a Viceroy's gold medal in an all India exhibition for one of his work. In 1955 he was awarded the Padma Bhushan by the Government of India, the third highest award a civilian can be given. In 1956, he was made the second Fellow of the Lalit Kala Akademi, the highest honour in the fine arts conferred by the Lalit Kala Akademi, India's National Academy of Art, Government of India.

Critical views 
In 1929 while inaugurating Roy's exhibition sponsored by Mukul Dey at Calcutta, the then Statesman Editor Sir Alfred Watson said:

Key works 

 "Ramayana", 1946, Spread across 17 canvases (106 × 76 cm, each) Roy's Ramayana is considered to be his magnum opus. Patronized by Sarada Charan Das, Roy created this masterpiece series in Kalighat pata style with natural colors, using earth, chalk powder and vegetable colors instead of dyes. Later Roy also created individual replicas capturing various moments from the entire series. Some of these paintings have been preserved in the National Art Gallery of India and are also in display in the Victoria Memorial Hall. His story of Ramayana begins with sage Valmiki and completes the circle back to his hermitage after Sita's aagnipariksha.  All  his 17 canvases are frequently characterized by decorative flowers, landscape, birds and animals typical of the Bengal School of Art. His lines are simple, bold and roundish initially derived from clay images but they lead to complex moments rendering subtle yet powerful emotions.  Jamini Roy's complete “Ramayana” is on display today at Sarada Charan Das' residence "Rossogolla Bhavan" in Kolkata along with 8 other large-scale originals. The Das residence today harbors the largest private collection of Jamini Roy paintings with 25 of the master's originals.
 "Bride and two Companions", 1952, tempera on card, 75 x 39 cm. Coates described the painting: "Note the magnificent indigo of Bengal, and how the palms of the bride's hands are smeared with red sandalpaste. Jamini Roy's choice of colours looks at first sight purely decorative. In fact, nearly every thing in his pictures has a reason and a meaning." It is very flat and heavily outlined. Roy portrays a traditional woman without the artificial beauty and the mythological background portraying the folk-art inspiration that has always been present since his beginnings.
 "Dual Cats with one Crayfish", 1968, tempera on card, 55.5 x 44 cm. Coates wrote: "Yet another new style, colours reduced in number and very restrained, an almost overwhelming sense of formality."

Death and legacy 
Jamini Roy died on 24 April 1972. In 1976, the Archaeological Survey of India, Ministry of Culture, Govt. of India declared his works among the "Nine Masters" whose work, to be henceforth considered "to be art treasures, having regard to their artistic and aesthetic value".

On 11 April 2017, Google India dedicated a Google Doodle to celebrate Roy on his 130th birthday.

References

Bibliography 
 
 
 
 Jamini Roy: A Painter Who Revisited the Roots. Niyogi Books. 2022. ISBN 978-93-91125-36-3.

External links 

Profile on Google Arts & Culture
Documentary by Films Division of India – Portrait of a Painter
Documentary by Virasat Art – The Art of Jamini Roy
Documentary by National Gallery of Modern Art – The Four Pioneers

20th-century Indian painters
Fellows of the Lalit Kala Akademi
1887 births
1972 deaths
People from Bankura district
Bengali male artists
Recipients of the Padma Bhushan in arts
Government College of Art & Craft alumni
University of Calcutta alumni
Modern painters
Indian portrait painters
Indian male painters
Painters from West Bengal
20th-century Indian male artists